Sir Richard Aldworth (1646 – 1707) was an Anglo-Irish politician and official in the Dublin Castle administration in Ireland. 

Aldworth was the Chief Secretary for Ireland from 1693 to 1696, and in 1695 he was made a member of the Privy Council of Ireland. He was a Member of Parliament for Dublin University in the Irish House of Commons between 1695 and 1699.

References

1646 births
1707 deaths
17th-century Anglo-Irish people
18th-century Anglo-Irish people
Chief Secretaries for Ireland
Irish knights
Irish MPs 1695–1699
Members of the Parliament of Ireland (pre-1801) for County Dublin constituencies
Members of the Privy Council of Ireland